Carl Sandburg College is a public community college with its main campus in Galesburg, Illinois. The college serves the west-central Illinois region, has a branch campus in Carthage and an off-campus site in downtown Galesburg.

The college was established in 1966 and is accredited by the Higher Learning Commission. Along with providing associate degree education for students, Sandburg also has over 50 occupational programs and continuing education/adult learning.

Academics
Carl Sandburg College offers 25 associate degrees and 33 certificates.

Transportation
Galesburg Transit provides Carl Sandburg College students and faculty with free public transit within Galesburg.

References

External links
 

Buildings and structures in Knox County, Illinois
Community colleges in Illinois
Education in Hancock County, Illinois
Education in Knox County, Illinois
Education in McDonough County, Illinois
Galesburg, Illinois
NJCAA athletics
Educational institutions established in 1966
1966 establishments in Illinois